The Samsung Galaxy S III Neo (also known as the Galaxy S3 Lite) is a slightly different version of the Samsung Galaxy S III. It is slightly less feature packed, such as a lack of a scratch proof screen, and its use of a Qualcomm Snapdragon 400 processor vs the first party Samsung Exynos 4 processor in the flagship.

Samsung unveiled the Galaxy S III Neo in April 2014, two years later than the original Galaxy S III release date.

Differences between S III and S III Neo 
The original Galaxy S III does not have the same specifications as the Neo, they differ depending on the topic.

See also 
 Samsung Galaxy S III
 Samsung Galaxy S III Mini
 Samsung Galaxy S series

References

External links 
 Official website

Android (operating system) devices
Qualcomm
Galaxy S
Galaxy S
Discontinued smartphones